Mom Luang Mingmongkol Sonakul (born 1971 in Bangkok, Thailand) is a Thai film producer and independent film director. As the head of her own production company, Dedicate Ltd., she has produced films by Apichatpong Weerasethakul (Mysterious Object at Noon); Pen-Ek Ratanaruang, including Invisible Waves; Pimpaka Towira's One Night Husband and The Tin Mine by Jira Maligool.

Biography

Education and career
Mingmongkol studied film at the San Francisco Art Institute. She then served as an intern at the Museum of Modern Art in New York before returning to Thailand.

As a director, her films tend towards experimentalism. Her first feature film, I-San Special, featured the audio from a radio soap opera set in a luxury resort hotel, played out by passengers on a rickety bus heading from Bangkok to Isan.

Her 2005 feature, 3 Friends, co-directed with Aditya Assarat and Pum Chinaradee, and starring Napakpapha Nakprasitte, is a blend of the "movie star exploitation" VCDs and unscripted reality television series, showing the bikini-clad actress taking a beach vacation with two other friends.

Filmography

As producer
 The River of Chao Phraya (1998)
 Mysterious Object at Noon (2000)
I-San Special (2002)
One Night Husband (2003)
The Tin Mine (2005)
3 Friends (2005)
Invisible Waves (2006)
Twelve Twenty (2006)
Alone (2007)

As director
I-San Special (2002)
3 Friends (2005)

External links
Dedicate Ltd.

1971 births
Living people
Mingmongkol Sonakul
Mingmongkol Sonakul
Mingmongkol Sonakul
Mingmongkol Sonakul
Mingmongkol Sonakul
Mingmongkol Sonakul
Mingmongkol Sonakul